Tarin may refer to:
 Tarin Jahan, Bangladeshi actress and model
 Tarin Kowt, a city in Afghanistan
 Tarin, Syria, a village in Syria
 Tarin Rock, Western Australia
 Tarin, character in The Legend of Zelda series
 Tareen, a Pashtun tribe, occasionally also spelt as 'Tarin'

People with surname Tarin
 Sardar Muhammad Habib Khan Tarin (1829–1888), Pashtun tribal chieftain and warrior
 Abdul Majid Khan Tarin (1877–1939), British-Indian political figure
 Haris Tarin (born 1978), Afghan-American Muslim activist
 Pierre Tarin (1735–1761), French encyclopedist
 Shaukat Tarin (born 1953), Pakistani banker and finance specialist

See also
 Tarim (disambiguation)